The Dollyrots is the fourth studio album by the Los Angeles-based pop-punk band The Dollyrots, released on Arrested Youth Records in 2012. According to an article on Yahoo! by Jason Tanamor, the band used a Kickstarter campaign to raise funds to record and release the album. Their original goal was to raise $7,500 but they ended up raising over $33,000.

Reception
"The Dollyrots are known for their stripped down 3-piece sound and songs from the Ramones school of songwriting - pure pop drenched in attitude. This is true of this record." (Molly Segers, Atlanta Music Guide)
"Kelly's voice is one that conveys enjoyment of the music that the band plays and as a whole you certainly label them alongside their good friends Bowling For Soup as "feel good" music. Luis's riffs are energetic and groove filled which further help add to the feel good factor and tick the boxes as far as quality pop punk is concerned." (Jamie Giberti, Scribes of Metal)
"The record sounds slicker than a slice of Velveeta that's been sitting out on the counter all day, but every song sounds like a hit." (Tim Sendra, Allmusic)
"The Dollyrots' self-titled CD doesn't stray far from previous offerings, with the signature chug-chug style and catchy melodies the group is known for. Fans of the Ramones will once again find plenty to eat up." (Matt Munoz, The Bakersfield Californian)

Track listing

Personnel
The following people worked on the album (taken from album sleeve notes).

The Dollyrots
Kelly Ogden- bass, vocals
Luis Cabezas- guitar, vocals
Alicia Warrington- drums

Other musicians
John Fields- drums, keyboards, programming
Stephen Lu- chincello (track 11)
Ken Chastain- sound fx (tracks 10 & 11)
Diane Small- gang vocals
Risty Perez- gang vocals
Jessica "Fuzzy" Isaacs- gang vocals
Chris Black- gang vocals
Lauren Dolan- gang vocals
Christina Ownby- gang vocals
Ela Darling- gang vocals

Production
John Fields- producer, mixing
Paul David Hager- mixing
C. Todd Nielsen- assistant mixing
Brad Blackwood- mastering

Cover
Kii Arens- design & photos

References

External links
The Dollyrots homepage

2012 albums
The Dollyrots albums
Albums produced by John Fields (record producer)
Kickstarter-funded albums